Mighty Express is a computer animated children's television series created by the British producer Keith Chapman. The series is produced by Spin Master Entertainment in partnership with Netflix, while the animation is produced by Atomic Cartoons. It was released on September 22, 2020.

The show was followed by a Christmas special, titled A Mighty Christmas, released on December 5, 2020. The second season was released on February 2, 2021, while the third season was released on April 13, 2021. The fourth season was released on July 27, 2021, while the fifth season was released on October 12, 2021. Ahead of its sixth season premiere, a special, titled Train Trouble, was released on January 18, 2022. The sixth season was released on March 29, 2022, while the seventh season was released on August 29, 2022. The show was followed by an interactive special, titled Mighty Trains Race, released on December 5, 2022.

Unlike the previous three seasons, which had ten-minute-long episodes placed in their regular ten-minute units, the episodes from the fourth, fifth, sixth and seventh seasons however, despite being ten minutes long, were placed back to back in half-hour units with two segments each, and unlike the previous six seasons, which all had ten-minute-long episodes, the seventh season however, despite still having ten-minute-long episodes, has a double-length episode and two compilation episodes featuring the shorts from the series.

Plot
The series takes place in Tracksville, a town located in a reality where human adults (with the exception of Santa Claus) have never existed and where kids run the stations and other locations and work together with the Mighty Express trains (who have the ability to talk and are intelligent) on epic adventures. The trains all have their own roles and duties within Tracksville, and their own individual set of tools and cargo cars to help them with their adventures so they always ensure to make their home a better place where trains and human kids alike live together in peace and harmony.

Characters

Trains

Main
The series follows the adventures of eight trains each with a different purpose and skill.
 Freight Nate (voiced by Dylan Schombing; Ben Riley in the UK dub; Tony Daniels when singing opera in Big Bart's Wild Ride) – Freight Nate is a mighty and fast train. His job is hauling heavy freight. He is strong, fast, friendly and heroic. Nate is equipped with an onboard crane with a hydraulic claw at the end of his cable. He also has a set of stabilizer legs to help him keep steady while loading his cars. Nate is painted red, grey and yellow with black frames and bright blue eyes.
 Mechanic Milo (voiced by Leo Orgil; Tom Rimmer in the UK dub) – Mechanic Milo's main job is keeping the tracks in tip top shape, but he will happily tackle any puzzle that gets thrown his way. He is curious and dependable and highly detail oriented. Milo has a hydraulic arm mounted on his back, with a claw on the end resembling a monkey wrench. He can also fire tracks from his front bufferbeam. His cab sports robotic arms in the sides and either drive spikes into the tracks he lays or welds them together. Milo wears silver safety goggles over his cab and is painted blue, white and deep orange. His eyes are green.
 Build-It Brock (voiced by Tyler Nathan; Chester Podd in the UK dub) – Build-It Brock builds what the town needs - bridges, train bays, concrete pads, tunnels through the mountain,(you name it.) Brock loves to help, even though he can be a bit shy at times. Brock has a cement mixer on his back and is equipped with a set of front end loader arms on his front. He is painted yellow, orange and grey with black hazard stripes and brown eyes.
 Farmer Faye (voiced by Michela Luci; Bethan Archer in the UK dub) – Farmer Faye is kind and caring, which fits her job profile. Her job is to move farm produce and animals and help out on the farm with feeding and fertilizing. Faye is friendly and community-minded, always keeping tabs on every train, kid, and critter in town. Her front section has a set of combine harvester reels, and she is painted green, orange and grey with orange eyes. Faye is the only mighty Express train not to run on bogies, as she has four small driving wheels joined by a pair of two larger ones, connected by a complex of coupling rods. She overall resembles a tractor crossed with a steam locomotive. She also speaks with a strong and powerful southwestern U.S. accent, and has a lasso in her roof to boot.
 Rescue Red (voiced by Evan Lefeuvre; Harry Coomber in the UK dub)– Rescue Red is a fire engine/EMT train and the older brother to Flicker that makes breath-taking rescues and takes care of the safety of everyone in town. He takes his job very seriously and is always focused on reciting helpful or not so helpful regulations from his handy guide, Red's Rulebook. Red has a ladder on his back and set of emergency lights atop his cab. He is painted fire engine red, silver and white with green eyes.
 Peoplemover Penny (voiced by Annick Obonsawin; Grace Mynard in the UK dub) – Peoplemover Penny is super friendly. Her job is to move kids from station to station and greets everyone in the morning with her bubbly personality. Penny can open her roof and elevate her seats to let her passengers into the open air, being painted cream, white and purple with green frames and blue eyes.
 Flicker (voiced by Ian Ho; Oliver White in the UK dub) – Flicker is a tiny engine and the little brother of Rescue Red. Flicker is in charge of small rescues. He is energetic and playful, but sometimes a bit naive. Flicker features a singular light on his roof and he features a fire hose reel on his rear that can also discharge air. and is painted red, white and silver with greenish-brown eyes. Flicker is smaller than the other trains, and as such, his interior is meant more for Diesel the Dog to ride in.
 Mandy Mail (voiced by Gracen Daly; Megan Cowlan in the UK dub) – A new female character that debuted in A Mighty Christmas. Mandy is very prideful and often expects important deliveries and at times will refuse help even when she needs it. Her job is to transport letters from kids and take them to either the North Pole for Santa Claus to receive or any destination around the world. She is painted white, blue, red, gold and yellow with purple eyes. Mandy joined the main roster starting with the Christmas special, and as a mail carrier, she possesses multiple compartments to carry packages and letters. Much like Flicker, Mandy's interior is meant more for animals to ride in, primarily Flap the Carrier Pigeon. She also has letter shooters.

Humans

Main
 Max (voiced by Jay Hatton; Theo Somolu in the UK dub) – Max is the leader of the team and the main kid in charge. Max is exuberant, energetic, inspiring and empathetic. Max is African-American and wears blue overalls.
 Liza (voiced by Zoe Hatz; Isabella Cobley in the UK dub) – Liza is a train whisperer. Being a mechanical engineer, she is creative, handy, optimistic, and all around spunky. always tinkering and poking around to see how things work. Liza is blonde and wears green overalls. She is the only female human member of the Mighty Express team.
 Nico (voiced by Meesha Contreras; Luca Bradley in the UK dub) – Nico is the trackmaster and cartographer. He is a quick thinker and multi-tasker, his nerdy enthusiasm also makes him a great puzzle solver. Nico wears blue glasses and red overalls.

Recurring / Minor
 Jubilee (voiced by Matilda Simons; Isabella Buck in the UK dub) - A girl with a disability who is possibly the mayor of Tracksville since she organizes special events and gives speeches.
 Clay (voiced by Benjamin Hum; Ollie Baulsom in the UK dub) - A young cowboy who runs Farm Station with May.
 May (voiced by  Lori Phun; Scarlett Harrison in the UK dub) - A young cowgirl who runs Farm Station with Clay.
 Carrie (voiced by Maja Vujicic; Connie McGrath (Season 1 - A Mighty Christmas) and Imogen Dymott (Season 4-present) in the UK dub) - A young girl who runs Mail Station.
 Amanda (voiced by Aaliyah Cinello; Cece Somolu in the UK dub) - A young girl who wears a headband with cat ears. She is Jaden's older sister, and appears to be the main kid in charge at School Station.
 Jaden (voiced by Adrian Groulx; Ved Pattipati in the UK dub) - A young boy who is Amanda's younger brother.
 Finn (voiced by Marcus Cornwall (Season 1-5; 7) and Javien Rankine (Season 5-present); Sam Hodge (Season 1–2) and Simeon Meadows (Season 3-present) in the UK dub) - A young boy who runs Beach Station and also acts as the local lifeguard.
 Skipper (voiced by Chris D'Silva; Rhys Nosworthy in the UK dub) - A young boy who runs Port Station.
 Dusty (voiced by Millie Davis; Efa Foncette in the UK dub) - A young girl who works at Building Yard Station. She helps with major construction projects in Tracksville.
 Ivy (voiced by Abigail Nicholson; Megan Leavey in the UK dub) - A young girl who is the organizer and counselor of outdoor activities at Camp Itchiknee.
 Marcus (voiced by Caleb Bellavance; Finn Kelly in the UK dub) - A young boy who runs the Central Square donut shop.
 Rocky (voiced by Callum Shoniker; Issac Highams in the UK dub) - A young boy who lives at Pointy Peak Station.
 Santa Claus (voiced by Ron Pardo; Wayne Forester in the UK dub) - Santa Claus is notable for being the only known adult human in the Mighty Express universe. His elves, however, are portrayed much more like the children of the Mighty Express universe. The head elf is voiced by Saara Chaudry; Megan Leavey in the UK dub.

Animals
 The Popstar Piggies also known as ('Flashy, Splashy, Glitzy and Larry) (voiced by Bryn McAuley and Richard Binsley) - A quartet of pigs who perform at events in Tracksville.
 Goaty McGoat - A goat who lives on top of Corkscrew Curve and has a tendency to get in trouble around Tracksville. Despite this, he is beloved by all who know him.
 Diesel (voiced by Robert Tinkler) - A dog who wears an American locomotive engineer's hat and a red bandana with purple spots. He most often spends his time either alone or with Flicker, and serves to keep the young train on the right track.
 Dippers (voiced by Dee Bradley Baker) - a dolphin that swims close to Port Station.
 Chompy (voiced by Frank Welker) - A beaver who lives at Building Yard Station.
 Cows (voiced by Richard Binsley) - A herd of cows that reside at Farm Station.
 Flap - A carrier pigeon in a mailman's outfit who works with Mandy Mail. Unlike Diesel, Flap works with Mandy full-time.
 Giggles - A baby octopus who swims close to Beach Station.
 Snowball - A penguin who lives in Pointy Peak Station.
 Big Bart - A bull who is the newest animal in Farm Station.
 Tiny - A whale who lives within the waters of Beach Station.

Antagonists

Trains
Tricky Ricky (voiced by Christian Campbell; Rahul Joshi in the UK dub) - Ricky is a trickster who while charismatic at first glance is very immature compared to the other trains, focusing on causing trouble for others instead of helping them. He works as a part of a duo with Sneaky Stella, though the two often argue on whose name goes first. Ricky is equipped with multiple tools and gadgets that rival the main Mighty Express trains, including a few that are copied directly from them. He is painted silver, white, purple and black and has blueish-purple eyes. He and Stella debuted in the special Train Trouble.

Humans
Sneaky Stella (voiced by Shazdeh Kapadia; Ada Tracz in the UK dub) - Stella is a young girl who delights in causing chaos, and unlike the Mighty Express crew does not care about the problems of others. She works as a part of a duo with Tricky Ricky, though the two often argue on whose name goes first. She wears pink glasses and black overalls with white gloves and boots (both with pink trim). She and Ricky debuted in the special Train Trouble.

List of  episodes

Season 1: September 22, 2020

Season 2: February 2, 2021

Season 3: April 13, 2021

Season 4: July 27, 2021

Season 5: October 12, 2021

Season 6: March 29, 2022

Season 7: August 29, 2022

Shorts Compilations (Part of Season 7 on Netflix): August 29, 2022
Short Tracks Part 1

Short Tracks Part 2

Specials

Merchandise

In 2021, an app based on the series was released for download on any smart device.

References

External links
 Official Website 
 
 
DubJuniros

2020s Canadian animated television series
2020s Canadian children's television series
2020 Canadian television series debuts
Canadian children's animated adventure television series
Canadian computer-animated television series
Canadian preschool education television series
English-language Netflix original programming
Animated television series about children
Television series about rail transport
Animated television series by Netflix
Animated preschool education television series
2020s preschool education television series
CBC Kids original programming